Neptis carpenteri is a butterfly in the family Nymphalidae. It is found in the eastern part of the Democratic Republic of the Congo, Uganda and north-western Tanzania.

References

Butterflies described in 1980
carpenteri